Southdown Motors Services Ltd (although this was the legal name of the company (until 1992) it was normally referred to as Southdown Motor Services) was a bus and coach operator in East and West Sussex and parts of Hampshire, in southern England. It was formed in 1915 and had various owners throughout its history, being purchased by the National Bus Company (NBC) in 1969. The company fleet name was lost when it was acquired by the Stagecoach Group in 1989 but buses operated under that legal name until 2015 when the operating licence was transferred to another company within the Stagecoach Group and 1915 company became dormant but still owned by the Stagecoach Group.

Early years

Southdown Motor Services can trace its history back to a pair of steam buses which operated between Pulborough and Worthing. However the company itself was formed in 1915, abandoning plans to call itself South Coast Motor Services (a similar name had been registered by a Folkestone operator). British Electric Traction (BET) took an early interest in the company, as did Thomas Tilling. The original registered office was in Middle Street, Brighton and in 1916, a garage was built in Freshfield Road. The operating area of the company was bounded by Eastbourne, Portsmouth and the Sussex border.

In 1921, joint services with Maidstone & District Motor Services (M&D) were started between Brighton and Hawkhurst (later service 18) and Eastbourne and Hastings via Hailsham (15). Similar services to Southampton and Winchester (joint with Hants & Dorset) began in 1922, although the Winchester service was truncated at Fareham in 1926. Horsham marked the boundary with Aldershot & District, Southdown later abandoning its operations in Haslemere in favour of the Aldershot company. Southdown also began to establish a programme of local long distance tours throughout the twenties and it was in 1921 that the famous Southdown scroll logo was adopted. Southdown pursued a policy of purchasing rival operators to consolidate its business. Companies acquired included Royal Red Coaches of Hove and Eastbourne operators Foard's, Cavendish, Southern Glideway and Chapman & Sons.

Expansion
Regular express services began in 1924, initially between Brighton and London (Lupus Street). It was a Southdown coach which was the first vehicle to enter Victoria Coach Station on 10 March 1932 (fleet number 202 - a Tilling-Stevens). Southdown turned to Hove coach builder Harrington for coach bodies, an arrangement that continued until the 1960s.

In 1929 the company started a coastal express service between Bournemouth and Margate, joint with East Kent Road Car Company and Hants & Dorset in competition with an existing Royal Blue service. This service later known as the South Coast Express (and eventually joint with Royal Blue) continued until NBC days.

Southdown's early orders favoured Tilling-Stevens chassis until the outbreak of World War II, although some all-Leyland Titans provided the company with its first closed top vehicles in 1929. The Titan continued to be the favoured double deck chassis until the end of BETs interest in the company. Oil engines were favoured and bodywork provided by a number of different coachbuilders, although Park Royal provided the majority of bus bodies, a relationship which continued into the NBC period.

Southdown benefited from the establishment of the London Passenger Transport Board in 1933, gaining services previously operated by East Surrey and Autocar in the Weald south of East Grinstead and Crawley. This also extended the company's eastern boundary to Heathfield.

Southdown became associated with BET following the division of Tilling and BET in 1942. The war was a difficult time in many ways for the company, although the casualties from enemy action remained low. Southdown's assistant traffic manager devised a scheme to overcome delays caused by the blackout on country routes by extending journey times on evening services, ensuring that connections would be maintained.

In 1946, a co-ordination agreement with Portsmouth Corporation was reached, splitting mileage and receipts on a 57:43 share, Southdown being the minority. This often had the result, at the end of the year, that buses from one operator would be put onto routes of the other to balance the mileage. The driver/conductor would not change, thereby working on a 'foreign' vehicle. This replaced an earlier agreement dating from 1931 involving protective fares on Southdown routes within the city. The co-ordination of services, dubbed Portsmouth Area Joint Transport Services, lasted until deregulation in 1986.

After the war, Southdown started its first overseas tours with a 17-day tour to France and Switzerland in 1950, operated by Leyland Tiger number 1223. This coach was transferred to Ulster in 1951 where it became the first to operate a programme of Irish tours for the company. 1950 also saw the introduction of scenic open top services from Brighton to Devil's Dyke and Eastbourne to Beachy Head, operated by decapitated war time Guys.

Beacon Motor Services of Crowborough was fully acquired in 1954 (although it had been controlled by Southdown since 1949). The company also controlled three services operated by Sargents of East Grinstead although these passed to M&D in 1951. In 1957 Southdown also entered into the Heathfield Pool agreement (also known as the Heathfield Cycle) with M&D by which all services through Heathfield became joint operations.

In 1958, mileage agreements were reached with the London Transport Executive for services in Crawley and with Brighton & Hove and Brighton Corporation for services in Brighton - establishing Brighton Area Transport Services, similar to the arrangements in Portsmouth established in the previous decade. The post war building programme continued with garages established at Crawley, Hassocks, Moulsecoomb and Seaford, while bus stations were opened in Chichester, Haywards Heath and Lewes.

It was during the late 1950s and 1960s that Southdown purchased many of the vehicle types most commonly associated with the company, notably the Leyland Titan PD3 'Queen Mary' vehicles. Southdown did not take any deliveries of rear engined double deck vehicles until 1970 when it purchased a batch of Daimler Fleetlines with Northern Counties bodywork similar to that on later PD3s for Brighton & Hove and a number of Bristol VRTs with Eastern Coach Works (ECW) bodies painted in green and cream livery. A further batch of Fleetlines with ECW bodywork was delivered in 1972.

In 1964, Southdown moved into new headquarters in Freshfield Road, which also became the headquarters of Brighton Hove & District in 1969 when that company passed to Southdown. The only visible difference at first was the addition of 2000 to the fleet numbers. Later vehicles were painted in Southdown's green and cream livery with the fleetname 'Southdown BH&D'. With the advent of NBC, green/white livery was adopted and the BH&D suffix dropped from the fleetname, although by 1985 most Brighton area Southdown vehicles carried Brighton & Hove fleetnames, being operated as a dedicated section of the company within the former BH&D area.

National Bus Company

In 1969 Southdown became part of the National Bus Company. Little change was noticeable at first, the corporate green and white livery not appearing until the early 1970s. There was, however, an influx of rear-engined double decker vehicles into the fleet, starting with Bristol VRTs and later Leyland Atlantean AN68s with Park Royal bodywork. The Leyland National became the standard single deck bus while the Leyland Leopard fulfilled coach orders. Southdown succeeded in maintaining a certain individuality during its NBC years, even painting some coaches in traditional livery and fleetnames (albeit with a small NBC logo). 1971 also saw the transfer of most Crawley services to and from London Country - a newly formed organisation within the National Bus Company.

1975 saw the forerunner of the 'Stagecoach' limited stop services with the 51 mile Brighton to Portsmouth Coastliner route 700. The following year saw the introduction of the 'Solenteer' between Portsmouth and Southampton (X71), operated jointly with Hants & Dorset. On the launch of both these services, messages were exchanged between the mayors of the terminus towns. This was followed by the Regency Route (729) in 1977 between Brighton and Tunbridge Wells, operated jointly with M&D.

These routes were rebranded (somewhat ironically) as Stage Coach in 1982. The network included services from Brighton to Worthing, Bognor Regis, Chichester and Portsmouth (700), Newhaven and Eastbourne (712), Lewes, Uckfield and Tunbridge Wells (729), Haywards Heath (770) and between Eastbourne and East Grinstead (780) and Rye via Hastings (799). The Stage Coach brand was also applied to occasional services to Winchester and Salisbury (710), Hawkhurst and Canterbury (718), Windsor and St Albans (735), and Oxford (738).

Southdown shared the operation of the Flightline 777 Service between Crawley, Gatwick Airport and London Victoria with London Country's Green Line operation. This service initially used Leyland Leopards, and latterly Leyland Tigers, and was one of four "airport network" service connecting Gatwick, Heathrow, Luton and Stansted with Central London.

Privatisation
Southdown celebrated its 70th anniversary in 1985, the year before deregulation, and buses carried a special logo which also appeared on publicity. With deregulation, the company adopted "Southdown East & Mid Sussex" and "Southdown West Sussex" fleetnames, while the Brighton & Hove operations became a separate company (Brighton & Hove). The East Sussex division registered a fairly basic network from the outset, linking a number of services together to form trunk services linking the major towns, sometimes by fairly circuitous routes. A version of Southdown's traditional livery was adopted, albeit with less cream than on the pre-NBC incarnation. The scroll fleetname returned on minibus operations and eventually the operations (except Brighton) were re-unified as Southdown.

Southdown was acquired by the Stagecoach Group in August 1989. A few vehicles (mainly Leyland Nationals) soon received the original Stagecoach white and stripes livery, albeit with the fleetname bearing "SOUTHDOWN - Part of the Stagecoach Group". Southdown's existence ended effectively in 1992 when the company changed its name to South Coast Buses Ltd, using the fleet names "In East Sussex" and "Coastline Buses" for the west. Upon the closure of the depot in Eastbourne in 2003, operations were split with the eastern end becoming "Stagecoach in Hastings" and the western division becoming "Stagecoach in the South Downs". The legal title of the western division then reverted to Southdown Motor Services Ltd. Until 2005, Stagecoach had four depots remaining in East Sussex (Eastbourne Outstation, Lewes, Seaford, Uckfield); the business in this area was sold to Brighton & Hove along with 15 buses and 66 staff.

Vehicles and artefacts of the old company are preserved at Amberley Museum & Heritage Centre by the Southdown Omnibus Trust.

In 2008, the Leyland PD3 or "Queen Marys" celebrated 50 years of operation, with many events held across the Southdown area.

Between 2000 and 2005 Queen Marys were operated on route 77 between Brighton and Devil's Dyke during the summer months by Southcoast Motor Services which is an operator specialising in operating preserved ex-Southdown buses. Southcoast Motor Services took its name from the original proposed name of Southdown Motor Services.

References

Bibliography

External links

Stagecoach Group
Former bus operators in East Sussex
Former bus operators in West Sussex
Former bus operators in Hampshire